La tarea según Natacha is an illustrated children's story that was first published by Alfaguara Infantil in collaboration with UNICEF in November, 2000. It is written by Luis Pescetti and illustrated by O'Kif.  The original publication features a foreword by Spanish essayist Fernando Savater.

In Bituín Bituín Natacha 

The story of La tarea según Natacha is also included as a stand-alone chapter in the chapter book Bituín bituín Natacha.

Synopsis 
Natacha and Pati have a project to complete for school.  They are supposed to write a report about children's right to education.  To complete their report, Natacha and Pati interview people who participate in the school system.

Books in the same series are:

Natacha (novel)
La tarea según Natacha
¡Buenísimo, Natacha! 
Chat, Natacha, chat 
Bituín bituín Natacha 
Querido diario (Natacha) 
La enciclopedia de las Chicas Perla 
Te amo, lectura (Natacha) 
Nuestro planeta, Natacha

References
  

Books by Luis Pescetti
2000 children's books
Children's short stories
Argentine short stories
Alfaguara books